Capsicum annuum var. glabriusculum is a variety of Capsicum annuum that is native to southern North America and northern South America. Common names include chiltepín, Indian pepper, chiltepe, and chile tepín, as well as turkey, bird’s eye, or simply bird peppers, due to their consumption and spread by wild birds, "unlike humans birds are impervious to the heat of peppers". Tepín is derived from a Nahuatl word meaning "flea". This variety is the most likely progenitor of the domesticated C. annuum var. annuum. Another similar-sized pepper, 'Pequin' (also called 'piquin') is often confused with tepin, although the tepin fruit is round to oval where as the pequin's fruit is oval with a point, and the leaves, stems and plant structures are very different on each plant.

Description
In areas without hard frost in winter, plants can live 35–50 years.

Fruit

Some strains of tepin peppers are much closer to perfectly round when fresh. A dried tepin pepper appears quite round even if it was slightly ellipsoidal when fresh. Tepin peppers are very hot, in Scoville Heat Units (SHU) measuring between 465,000–1,629,000, or 325,000–2,469,000 depending on the capsaicinoid ⇨ SHU conversion method.

The tepin can be hotter than the habanero or red savina, with the highest levels seen in green fruit 40-50 days after fruit set.

However and since this pepper is primarily harvested from wild stands in the Mexican desert, the heat level of the fruit can vary greatly from year to year, depending on the amount of natural rainfall that occurs during the time the fruits are forming. Fruit heat levels can be weak during drought years, and normal rainfall years produce the highest heat levels.  The heat levels also varies between the green fresh fruits (which are pickled in vinegar), red-ripe fresh fruits, dried whole fruit, and dried fruit with the seeds removed, with heat levels arranged from mildest to hottest in that order. Around 50 tons are estimated to be harvested commercially annually in Mexico, primarily in Sonora.

In Mexico, the heat of the chiltepin is called arrebatado ("rapid" or "violent"), because, while the heat is intense, it is not very enduring. This stands in contrast to the domesticated 'Pequin' variety, which is the same size as the wild tepin, but is oval-shaped, and delivers a decidedly different experience.

The different drying methods used for the tepin and 'Pequin', can help tell these peppers apart. Tepins are always sun-dried, whereas the Pequins are commonly dried over wood smoke, and the smell of the smoke in the Pequins can help separate the two varieties. Pequins are not as hot as chiltepins (only about 30,000–50,000 Scoville units), but they have a much slower and longer-lasting effect.

Habitat and range
C. a. var. glabriusculum can be found in Texas, Arizona, Louisiana and Florida in the Southern United States, the Bahamas, the Caribbean, Mexico, Central America, and Colombia. It may be found in areas with a broken forest canopy or disturbed areas that lack tree cover if moisture and soil are favorable. Elsewhere, such as in Arizona, it may require the partial shading of a nurse plant.

Symbolism
Chiltepin was named "the official native pepper of Texas" in 1997, two years after the jalapeño became the official pepper of Texas.

Conservation
In 1999, Native Seeds/SEARCH and the United States Forest Service established the  Wild Chile Botanical Area in the Coronado National Forest. Located in the Rock Corral Canyon near Tumacacori, Arizona, the preserve protects a large C. a. var. glabriusculum population for study and as a genetic reserve.

See also
List of Capsicum cultivars
Capsicum annuum
Capsicum

Notes

External links

 Tepin, in What Am I Eating? A Food Dictionary

annuum var. glabriusculum
Plants described in 1975
Flora of the Bahamas
Flora of the Caribbean
Flora of Central America
Flora of Colombia
Flora of Florida
Flora of Mexico
Flora of Texas
Symbols of Texas
Chili peppers